Overload or overloaded may refer to:

Arts and entertainment
Overload (novel), a 1979 novel by Arthur Hailey
Overload (Teen Titans), a character from the Teen Titans animated series
Overload (video game), a 2018 first-person shooter game from Revival Productions
"Overload", an episode from the second season of the television series CSI: Crime Scene Investigation

Medical
Information overload, having too much information to make a decision or remain informed about a topic
Iron overload, an accumulation of iron in the body from any cause
Sensory overload, occurs when one or more of the body's senses experiences over-stimulation from the environment

Music

Bands
Overload (Chinese band), a Chinese rock / thrash metal band
Overload (Pakistani band), a Pakistani rock band from Lahore, Punjab
Overload (Swedish band), a heavy metal band from Bollnäs, Sweden
Overload Generation, an English boy band

Albums
Overload (Anthem album), a 2000 album by Japanese heavy metal band Anthem
Overload (Georgia Anne Muldrow album), a 2018 album by American musician Georgia Anne Muldrow
Overload (Harem Scarem album), a 2005 album by the Canadian hard rock band Harem Scarem
Overload (Overload album), a 2006 album by Pakistani rock band Overload
Overloaded: The Singles Collection, a 2006 album by the Sugababes
Overload (EP), a 2022 extended play by South Korean rock band Xdinary Heroes

Songs
"Overload" (John Legend song), a song from the album Darkness and Light (album)
"Overload" (Dot Rotten song), a 2012 grime/dubstep song by rapper Dot Rotten
"Overload" (Sugababes song), a 2000 pop song by the UK girl group Sugababes
"Overload" (Voodoo and Serano song), a 2003 dance song by Voodoo and Serano
"Overload", a song by Raven from their 1987 album Life's a Bitch
"The Overload", a song by Talking Heads from their 1980 album Remain in Light

Technology
Electrical overload
Function overloading, the ability to create multiple functions of the same name with different implementations
Mechanical overload (engineering), when a component is stressed to failure in one event
Operator overloading, a process where different operators have different implementations depending on their arguments 
Overload (magazine), a software development journal
Overload protection, for power supplies

Other uses
Overload (chess)
Overload (convention), a comic and manga convention held in Auckland, New Zealand
Operation Overload, a military operation by the Rhodesian Army in 1974

See also
 Maximum Overload (disambiguation)
 Overloading (disambiguation)
 Overlay (disambiguation)
 Overlap (disambiguation)
 Overpower